Slemp may refer to:

People
Campbell Slemp (1839–1907), Confederate Army officer and American politician
C. Bascom Slemp (1870–1943), American educator, politician and philanthropist, son of Campbell

Other
Slemp, Kentucky, an unincorporated community in Perry County